This page lists board and card games, wargames, miniatures games, and tabletop role-playing games published in 2008.  For video games, see 2008 in video gaming.

Games released or invented in 2008

Game awards given in 2008
Spiel des Jahres: Keltis
Spiel des Jahres special prize for Best complex game: Agricola
Kinderspiel des Jahres: Wer war’s?
Mensa Select: AmuseAmaze, Eye Know, Jumbulaya, Pixel, Tiki Topple
Games: Tzaar
 Agricola won the Spiel Portugal Jogo do Ano.

Significant games-related events in 2008
Cranium, Inc. purchased by Hasbro for US$77.5 million.

Deaths

See also
List of game manufacturers
2008 in video gaming
2008 in chess
2008 in darts

References

Games
Games by year